The 2016–17 WPI Engineers men's basketball team represented Worcester Polytechnic Institute during the 2016–17 NCAA Division III men's basketball season. They were coached by a 19-year coaching veteran, Chris Bartely. The Engineers played their home games at Harrington Auditorium in Worcester, Massachusetts and were a part of the New England Women's and Men's Athletic Conference (NEWMAC). The Engineers finished the regular season with a 17-9 record and lost 61-63 to MIT in the Semifinal round of the NEWMAC Tournament.

Previous season

WPI received an at-large bid to the 2016 NCAA Men's Division III basketball tournament. The Engineers lost in the first round to the SUNY Cortland Red Dragons, 50-69.

Schedule

|-
!colspan=9 style="background:#AC2B37; color:#FFFFFF;"| Regular season

|-
!colspan=9 style="background:#AC2B37; color:#FFFFFF;"| NEWMAC men's tournament

References

WPI Engineers men's basketball seasons